The Morispora is a genus of rust fungi in the family Phragmidiaceae. The genus is monotypic, containing the single South American species Morispora tenella.

References

External links
 

Pucciniales
Taxa described in 2007
Fungi of South America
Monotypic Basidiomycota genera